Baltimore City College, also referred to as B.C.C., City, City College, and The Castle on the Hill, is the third oldest continuously public high school in the United States. This article is about Notable Knights of the Baltimore City College,
that is, graduates of BCC.

Since being established by an act of the Baltimore City Council in 1839, hundreds of influential civic, political, business, commercial, industrial, and cultural leaders have passed through its doors. Many graduates of City College have served as members of the United States Congress and the Maryland General Assembly, federal and circuit judges, award-winning journalists; leaders in business, commerce, the military, the sciences, and the arts. This list includes three former Governors of Maryland and recipients of the Nobel Prize, the Pulitzer Prize, and the Wolf Prize. Of the seven Maryland recipients of the Medal of Honor between World War I and World War II, three were graduates of the Baltimore City College. Numerous bridges, buildings, craters, highways, institutions, monuments, and professorships have been named for B.C.C. alumni.

Arts and entertainment

Business

Clergy and education

Government and politics

Congress

Governors

State legislature

Judiciary

Federal government

State and local officials

Journalism

Military

Science

Sports

Notes

References

External links
 Baltimore City College Alumni Association
 Baltimore City College Hall of Fame

Baltimore City College

Baltimore City College
Baltimore City College
Baltimore City College